Veluwana College in Dematagoda was established 11 June 1951 by the Buddhist Society led by Veluwanarama temple. It is one of the oldest Buddhist schools in Sri Lanka. Veluwana College is a National School. It provides primary and secondary education.

School anthem
The school anthem was composed by Siril A. Seelawimala.

Houses

Students are placed in one of three houses according to their admission number. They compete each year to win the inter-house competitions.
 –  Abhaya (අභය)
 –  Vijaya (විජය)
 –  Gemunu (ගැමුණු)

Veluwana College today 
Today Veluwana College has about 1200 students and about 60 staff, led by Principal Mr.Sidney Ahsoka Lokukumara. Veluwana College has been at the forefront of the Sri Lankan national schools and is considered to be one of the outstation schools in the country.

Principals 
 Karaputugala Dhammawansha tero (1951.06.11-1955.05.31)
 W. M. S. Wimalasooriya (1955.06.01-1965.09-06)
 Wiliyam Galagedara (1965.09.15-1967.09.03)
 S. S. Fernando (1967.09.04-1970.07.03)
 W. M. S. Wimalasooriya (1970.07.04-1971.01.15)
 S. S. Kaluthanthree (1971.03.13-1972.01.02)
 H. M. Samanasinghe (1972.03.09-1986.09.04)
 E. F. Ranasinghe (1987.02.17-1994.12.27)
 A. Thiranagama (1994.12.28-2003.05.07)
 S. Garusinghe (2003.06.04-2006.07.11)
 W. Karunathilake (2006.08.15-2016.06.08)
 Sydney Ashoka Lokukumara (2016.11.10-  )

Notable alumni
 Chandika Hathurusingha - Former Sri Lanka Test/One Day International Cricketer, Member of World Cup Winning Cricket Team 1996.

References

Educational institutions established in 1952
National schools in Sri Lanka
Schools in Colombo District
1952 establishments in Ceylon